Timothy Brian Gibbs (born April 17, 1967) is an American director, actor, producer, and screenwriter who has starred in films, such as 11-11-11 as Joseph Crone and The Kings of Brooklyn as Maximilian Sentor and television programs, such as Sex and the City as Detective Stevens.

Life and career
Gibbs was born in Calabasas, California. He began his acting career at age 10 in commercials and later guest starring in television series before getting his first prominent roles was that of 'Will Adams' in the NBC drama series Father Murphy which ran from 1981 to 1983. He also played Chad Everett's son on the short-lived NBC series The Rousters.

He is perhaps best known for starring in soap operas such as Another World as Gary Sinclair from 1995 to 1998 and Santa Barbara as Dash Nichols from 1990 to 1992.

In 2000, Gibbs was nominated for an Emmy award for his portrayal of the fictional character Kevin Buchanan (from 1998 to 2001) on the television series One Life to Live.

In 2003, Gibbs was used as a model for the designing of the video game character Max Payne in the sequel Max Payne 2: The Fall of Max Payne. In the first Max Payne game, the character was originally modeled after the writer of the series, Sam Lake.

Gibbs co-founded the Alkeme Company, a media firm based in Barcelona, Spain and Los Angeles, California.

In 2013, Gibbs created and produced the CIA procedural drama I/Nation, a television series in which he portrays Sidney "Sid" Porter, a self-destructive CIA agent.  Gibbs wrote each of the thirteen episodes which make up the show's premier season and directed the series pilot.

In 2015, Gibbs, a lifelong collector, founded Gibbs & Son Ltd, a vintage furniture showroom located in Sant Cugat del Valles, Spain.

Filmography
I/Nation (2013) – Sidney Porter
Tasting Menu (2012) – Daniel Duncan
11-11-11 (2011) – Joseph Crone
The Kings of Brooklyn (2004) – Sentor
Season of the Hunted (2003) – Steve
Sex and the City (2000) – Detective Stevens
One Life to Live (1998–2001) – Lt. Governor Kevin Lord Riley Buchanan
Another World (1995–1998) – Gary Sinclair
Witchboard 2: The Devil's Doorway (1993) – Mitch
Secrets (1992) TV mini-series .... Claude Rodier
Santa Barbara (1990 to 1992) – Dash Nichols
Father Dowling Mysteries (1990) – Rick McMasters
Police Story: The Watch Commander (1988) – Off. John Reynolds
Growing Pains (1987) – Jerry Delish
The Kindred (1987) - Hart Phillips
The Deliberate Stranger (1986) – John
Just Between Friends (1986) – Jeff Davis
The Get Along Gang (1984) – Catchum Crocodile
The Rousters (1983) – Michael Earp
Father Murphy (1981–1983) – Will Adams
Goldie and the Boxer Go to Hollywood (1981) – Artie
The Jeffersons (1979) – Binky

References

External links

The Alchemy Company
Gibbs & Son

1967 births
American male soap opera actors
American male television actors
Film producers from California
American male screenwriters
American male child actors
Living people
Male actors from California
People from Calabasas, California
Film directors from California
Screenwriters from California